Things Ain't What They Used to Be is a 1970 studio album by the American jazz singer Ella Fitzgerald - the final album that Fitzgerald recorded on the Reprise Records label. The album was re-issued on CD with alternative artwork in 1989. It was released together on one CD with Ella's first album recorded for Reprise label, Ella.

Track listing
For the 1970 LP on Reprise Records; RS 6432; Re-issued by Reprise-Warner Bros. in 1989 on CD; Reprise 9 26023-2

Side One:
 "Sunny" (Bobby Hebb)  – 5:18
 "Mas que Nada" (Jorge Ben Jor, English Lyrics by Loryn Deane)  – 3:49
 "A Man and a Woman (Un Homme et une Femme)" (Pierre Barouh, Francis Lai, Jerry Keller)  – 3:17
 "Days of Wine and Roses" (Henry Mancini, Johnny Mercer)  – 2:22
 "Black Coffee" (Sonny Burke, Paul Francis Webster)  – 4:28
 "Tuxedo Junction" (Julian Dash, Buddy Feyne, Erskine Hawkins, Bill Johnson)  – 3:17
Side Two:
 "I Heard It Through the Grapevine" (Barrett Strong, Norman Whitfield)  – 3:44
 "Don't Dream of Anybody But Me" (AKA "Li'l Darlin'") (Neal Hefti, Bart Howard)  – 4:06
 "Things Ain't What They Used to Be" (Mercer Ellington, Ted Persons) – 3:11
 "Willow Weep for Me" (Ann Ronell)  – 4:40
 "Manteca" (Dizzy Gillespie, Gil Fuller, Chano Pozo) – 2:30
 "Just When We're Falling in Love" (AKA "Robbins Nest")  (Illinois Jacquet, Bob Russell, Sir Charles Thompson)  – 2:29

Personnel
Recorded May 26–30, 1969, in Hollywood, Los Angeles:

 Ella Fitzgerald - Vocals
 Gerald Wilson - Arranger, Conductor.
 Tommy Flanagan - piano
 Joe Sample - electric piano, organ
 Louis Bellson - drums
 Modesto Duran - congas
 Francisco DeSouza - congas
 Victor Feldman - vibes, percussion
 Bobby Hutcherson - vibes
 Herb Ellis - guitar
 Dennis Budimir - guitar
 Ray Brown - bass, electric bass
 Bobby Bryant - trumpet
 Larry McGuire - trumpet
 Alex Rodriquez - trumpet
 Paul Hubinon - trumpet
 Harry Edison - trumpet
 J. J. Johnson- trombone
 James Cleveland- trombone
 Mike Wimberly- trombone
 Britt Woodman- trombone
 William Tole- trombone
 Thurman Green- trombone
 Arthur Maebe - French horn, tuba
 Henry DeVega - alto
 Harold Land - tenor
 Ray Bojorquez - tenor
 Richard Aplanalp - baritone
 Marshal Royal - woodwinds
 Anthony Ortega - woodwinds
 Ernie Watts - woodwinds
 Bill Green - woodwinds

References

1970 albums
Ella Fitzgerald albums
Albums produced by Norman Granz
Reprise Records albums
Albums arranged by Gerald Wilson
Albums conducted by Gerald Wilson